Euro gold and silver commemorative coins are special euro coins minted and issued by member states of the Eurozone, mainly in gold and silver, although other precious metals are also used in rare occasions. Greece was one of the first twelve countries in the Eurozone that introduced the euro (€) on 1 January 2002. Since 2003, the Mint of Greece have been minting both normal issues of Greek euro coins, which are intended for circulation, and commemorative euro coins in gold and silver.

These special coins have a legal tender only in Greece, unlike the normal issues of the Greek euro coins, which have a legal tender in every country of the Eurozone. This means that the commemorative coins made of gold and silver cannot be used as money in other countries. Furthermore, as their bullion value generally vastly exceeds their face value, these coins are not intended to be used as means of payment at all—although it remains possible. For this reason, they are usually named Collectors' coins.

The coins usually commemorate the anniversaries of historical events or draw attention to current events of special importance. Greece mints four of these coins on average per year, mainly in silver, with a typical face value of €10. However, to celebrate the 2004 Olympic Games in Athens, Greece minted almost three times more than normal number of coins in 2003 and 2004, in both gold and silver.

Summary 

As of 27 October 2008, 36 variations of Greek commemorative coins have been minted: 15 in 2003, 12 in 2004, one in 2005, three in 2006, four in 2007 and one in 2008 so far. These special high-value commemorative coins are not to be confused with €2 commemorative coins, which are coins designated for circulation and do have legal tender status in all countries of the Eurozone.

The following table shows the number of coins minted per year. In the first section, the coins are grouped by the metal used, while in the second section they are grouped by their face value.

2003 coinage

2004 coinage

2005 coinage

2006 coinage

2007 coinage

2008 coinage

Notes

References 
 All euro greek commemorative coins poster

Coins of Greece
Greece
Cultural depictions of Maria Callas